The Game Caterers is a South Korean variety show that airs on tvN and a re-run on YouTube channel, 'Fullmoon' after the broadcast. This program is tvN's short-form content following the previous Don't Look Back.

Background
The Game Caterers is a new concept entertainment delivery service in which producer Na Yeong-seok (Na PD) visits official broadcasting events and entertainment programs of various guests, regardless of entertainment or drama, and plans to bring laughter to guests through multiple games played in New Journey to the West or Channel 15 Nights.

A total of 19 teams in the span of both seasons appeared on the show. In season 1, 51 people were on seven business trips, from the first business trip Hospital Playlist Goes Camping to BH Entertainment. In season 2, The Game Caterers draws attention by trying to expand the format as a unique feature of picnics that inevitably require long recordings. When asked about the secret to recruiting guests for each episode, PD Ham Moo-seong of the show said, "I try to make the atmosphere at the scene comfortable by packing the staff in the smallest possible size. It seems that this part is well known to artists and officials." Six out of 19 teams are entertainment agencies such as Antenna, BH Entertainment, Artist Company, YG Entertainment, Hybe Label, and Starship Entertainment.

Overview

Notes
 In season 1, it was aired for 5 minutes at 22:50 on Friday. After the broadcast, the full version was released on the Fullmoon YouTube Channel.
 In season 2, episode 1 was aired for 20 minutes at 22:50 on December 24, 2021. Then, starting from episode 2, which airs on January 7, 2022, it aired for 5 minutes on Friday at 22:30. After the broadcast, the full version was released on the Fullmoon YouTube Channel.

Episodes

Season 1

Season 2

Poster
In the published poster for season 1, the design of the program's poster is reminiscent of a fifteen-year-old egg-shaped character with a fierce expression holding a flag and carrying a yellow suitcase. In the published poster for season 2, the program introduced a new character 'Fifteen Nyang'. The poster showed it was running recklessly forward, wearing a yellow cone hat and a sling bag. The bags contain game tools that Na Young-seok (PD Na) uses for his games, such as five dragon balls (orbs), a stopwatch, jegichagi, yut, a ping-pong paddle and a conical hat.

Reception
On June 4, 2021, The Game Caterers Season 1 accumulated 34 million views on its Channel 15 Nights YouTube channel and reached a maximum of 200,000 concurrent users in real-time streaming. According to the Weekly Report on the Content Influence Index published by CJ ENM every week, The Game Caterers episodes with Hybe Label took second place for two consecutive weeks and topped the most influential entertainment show for the 4th week of July, July 25 – 31, 2022. As of December 2021, season 1 surpassed 150 million cumulative views on its YouTube channel.

In the first episode with Starship Entertainment, the number of views on YouTube exceeded 7.5 million in 13 days after its release. It rose ten places and ranked 7th in the non-drama TV topical category based on Good Data Corporation in the 2nd week of November.

Ratings
In the table below,  represent the lowest ratings and  represent the highest ratings.

Notes

References

External links
  
  
 
 
 

2020s South Korean television series
2021 South Korean television series debuts
TVN (South Korean TV channel) original programming
Korean-language television shows
South Korean variety television shows
South Korean game shows
Web game shows